The Malaysia Rugby League Premier 2017 was the 17th season of Malaysia Rugby League Premier, Malaysia's domestic rugby union competition. The kick off will begin on 4 February 2017. This season embarks the newly, organized league structure, with more involvement of clubs from entire Malaysia to develop the excitement of rugby scene in Malaysia.

Teams

A total of 12 teams will compete in the 2017 season.

  Cobra RC
  NS Wanderers RC
  UPM Angels
  UiTM Lions
  ASAS RC
  DBKL
  Panthers Blowpipes
  Keris Conlay RC
  Iskandar Raiders
  SSTMI Tsunami
  Mersing Eagles
  Politeknik Merlimau

Season

In preliminary stage, all 12 teams were divided into 2 groups, and a single round-robin tournament was held by both groups.

Standings

Teams 1 to 4 (Green background) at the end of the preliminary competition rounds qualify for the final stage.
The lowest-placed teams (Red background) were relegated.

Grouping stage matches

Week 1

Week 2

Week 3

Week 4

Week 5

Final round
In the final round, ASAS RC played against Keris Conlay and Keris Conlay won with 24 points, the ASAS RC having 17.

See also

 Malaysia Rugby League Premier

References

External links
Malaysia Rugby
Malaysia Rugby Union

2017
2017 rugby union tournaments for clubs